Saline Township is an inactive township in Ralls County, in the U.S. state of Missouri.

Saline Township was so named on account of the abundance of natural salt within its borders.

References

Townships in Missouri
Townships in Ralls County, Missouri